Fehmi Emre Güngör (born 1 August 1984) is a Turkish former footballer who played as a defender. He was part of the Turkey squad that reached the semi-finals of Euro 2008.

Honours
Galatasaray
Süper Lig (1): 2007–08
Süper Kupa (1): 2007–08

Turkey
UEFA European Championship: Semi-finals (1): 2008

Career statistics

International goals

References

External links

1984 births
Living people
Footballers from Istanbul
Turkish footballers
MKE Ankaragücü footballers
Türk Telekom G.S.K. footballers
Galatasaray S.K. footballers
Gaziantepspor footballers
Antalyaspor footballers
Süper Lig players
Turkey international footballers
Turkey under-21 international footballers
UEFA Euro 2008 players
Turkey youth international footballers
Association football defenders